Quern – Undying Thoughts is an adventure video game by Zadbox Entertainment. It runs on Windows, Mac, and Linux. Quern was released for Xbox One on April 24, 2020. The game was developed by four Hungarian graduate students, one of whom lives in the United Kingdom.

Gameplay
The plot involves a character arriving on the mysterious island of Quern with no memory of the past, passing through a gateway which thereafter self-destructs. There are dozens of puzzles to solve opening approximately fifty locked doors; all are needed to find a way off the island. There is no hostility or combat.

Reception
PCWorld gave the game 4 out of 5 stars, saying it was similar to Myst of old with  excellent gameplay. Adventure Gamers gave it 4/5 stars. Metacritic gave it a positive score of 83/100.

References

2016 video games
Adventure games
First-person adventure games
Linux games
MacOS games
Puzzle video games
Video games developed in the United Kingdom
Video games developed in Hungary
Video games set on fictional islands
Windows games